Mr. R&Beats is the twelfth studio album by Taiwanese Mandopop artist Will Pan. Originally scheduled for 14 August 2020, the album's release was postponed to 10 September 2020, for undisclosed reasons. Mr. R&Beats is Pan's second album release under Warner Music Taiwan. Most of the album was produced by Jeremy Ji and Pan himself, while other producers included Tha Aristocrats and Mr Danny.

The album's lead single, "To Be Loved", was digitally released on 15 July 2020, following which the second lead single, "Second Option", was digitally released on 31 July 2020.

Promotion
An online concert was held on 20 September 2020 at 8 p.m. UTC+08:00 to support the album. It was broadcast on Line Music, Joox and NetEase Music.

Track listing

Music videos

Charts

References

External links 
 Will Pan official website
 Mr.R&Beats (節奏先生) @  Warner Music Taiwan

2020 albums
Will Pan albums
Warner Music Taiwan albums